Serra High School may refer to:

Junípero Serra High School (Gardena, California), United States
Junípero Serra High School (San Mateo, California), United States
Serra Catholic High School, in McKeesport, Pennsylvania, United States
Serra Catholic School, in Rancho Santa Margarita, California, United States
Canyon Hills High School (San Diego), formerly Junipero Serra High School, United States
JSerra Catholic High School, in San Juan Capistrano, California, United States

Junípero Serra